Parliamentary elections were held in Bulgaria on 28 March 1920. It was compulsory to vote. The result was a victory for the Bulgarian Agrarian National Union (BANU), which won 110 of the 229 seats. Voter turnout was 77%.

Results

Aftermath
The BANU government annulled the election of 13 deputies –  nine of them Communists – which gave them a majority in parliament.

References

Bulgaria
1920 in Bulgaria
Parliamentary elections in Bulgaria
March 1920 events
1920 elections in Bulgaria